Trey Millard (born July 25, 1991) is a former American football fullback. He was drafted by the San Francisco 49ers in the seventh round of the 2014 NFL Draft. He played college football at Oklahoma.

Professional career

San Francisco 49ers
Millard was placed on the non-football injury list for the start of the 2014 NFL season.

On August 31, 2015, Millard was waived by the 49ers during the final preseason roster cuts.

Kansas City Chiefs
On January 5, 2016, Millard signed a futures contract with the Kansas City Chiefs.

References

1991 births
Living people
Oklahoma Sooners football players
American football fullbacks
Sportspeople from Columbia, Missouri
Rock Bridge High School alumni
Players of American football from Missouri
African-American players of American football
San Francisco 49ers players
Kansas City Chiefs players
21st-century African-American sportspeople